Ward 25 Scarborough—Rouge Park is a municipal ward in the Scarborough section of Toronto, Ontario, Canada.

References

Toronto city council wards
Scarborough, Toronto